Doctor Raúl Peña is a district located in the Alto Paraná Department of Paraguay. It was previously part of the Naranjal District and it was created as a district on September 11, 2012.

References 

Districts of Alto Paraná Department
2012 establishments in Paraguay